This is a list of the National Register of Historic Places listings in Cass County, Texas.

This is intended to be a complete list of properties listed on the National Register of Historic Places in Cass County, Texas. There are three properties listed on the National Register in the county. All three are Recorded Texas Historic Landmarks including one that is also a State Antiquities Landmark.

Current listings

The locations of National Register properties may be seen in a mapping service provided.

|}

See also

National Register of Historic Places listings in Texas
Recorded Texas Historic Landmarks in Cass County

References

External links

Cass County, Texas
Cass County
Buildings and structures in Cass County, Texas